John Craggs (born c. 1880) was an English footballer who played for Sunderland, Nottingham Forest and 
Reading as a forward.

Club career
Craggs made his debut for Sunderland on 16 November 1901 in a 4–2 defeat against Everton at Roker Park. Over his career at the club, he made 43 league appearances scoring 15 goals.

References

1880s births
Year of death missing
English footballers
Sunderland A.F.C. players
Nottingham Forest F.C. players
Reading F.C. players
People from Trimdon
Footballers from County Durham
Association football forwards